Venkatesan Guruswami (born 1976) is a senior scientist at the Simons Institute for the Theory of Computing and Professor of EECS and Mathematics at the University of California, Berkeley.  He did his high schooling at Padma Seshadri Bala Bhavan in Chennai, India. He completed his undergraduate in Computer Science from IIT Madras and his doctorate from Massachusetts Institute of Technology under the supervision of Madhu Sudan in 2001. After receiving his PhD, he spent a year at UC Berkeley as a Miller Fellow, and then was a member of the faculty at the University of Washington from 2002 to 2009. His primary area of research is computer science, and in particular on error-correcting codes. During 2007–2008, he visited the Institute for Advanced Study as a Member of School of Mathematics. He also visited SCS at Carnegie Mellon University during 2008–09 as a visiting faculty.  From July 2009 through December 2020 he was a faculty member in the Computer Science Department in the School of Computer Science at Carnegie Mellon University.

Recognition
Guruswami was awarded the 2002 ACM Doctoral Dissertation Award for his dissertation List Decoding of Error-Correcting Codes, which introduced an algorithm that allowed for the correction of errors beyond half the minimum distance of the code. It applies to Reed–Solomon codes and more generally to algebraic geometric codes.

He was an invited speaker in International Congress of Mathematicians 2010, Hyderabad on the topic of "Mathematical Aspects of Computer Science."

Guraswami was one of two winners of the 2012 Presburger Award, given by the European Association for Theoretical Computer Science for outstanding contributions by a young theoretical computer scientist.
He was elected as an ACM Fellow in 2017, as an IEEE Fellow in 2019, and to the 2023 class of Fellows of the American Mathematical Society, "for contributions to the theory of computing and error-correcting codes, and for service to the profession".

Selected publications

See also
Guruswami–Sudan list decoding algorithm

References

External links 
 Venkatesan Guruswami's Homepage
 

1976 births
Living people
Scientists from Chennai
Indian computer scientists
Theoretical computer scientists
IIT Madras alumni
Massachusetts Institute of Technology alumni
Carnegie Mellon University faculty
University of California, Berkeley faculty
Padma Seshadri Bala Bhavan schools alumni
Fellows of the Association for Computing Machinery
Fellows of the American Mathematical Society